Shaheen Raza Cheema (1954 – 20 May 2020) was a Pakistani politician and a member of the Provincial Assembly of the Punjab who hailed from Gujranwala. She held the office from August 2018 to May 2020. She died of COVID-19 on 20 May 2020.

Political career
She was elected to the Provincial Assembly of the Punjab as a candidate of Pakistan Tehreek-e-Insaf (PTI) on a reserved seat for women from Gujranwala in 2018 Pakistani general election.

Death 
Raza died in the Mayo Hospital in Lahore from COVID-19 during the COVID-19 pandemic in Pakistan on 20 May 2020. Her age has been reported as 69, 65 and 60. It is said that she caught the virus while visiting a field hospital for coronavirus treatment in Gujranwala. Reportedly she suffered from diabetes and blood pressure issues at the time of her death.
She was buried in Gujranwala.

References

2020 deaths
Punjabi people
Punjab MPAs 2018–2023
Pakistan Tehreek-e-Insaf MPAs (Punjab)
1954 births
Women members of the Provincial Assembly of the Punjab
21st-century Pakistani women politicians
Deaths from the COVID-19 pandemic in Punjab, Pakistan